The Solemn Oath (German: Das Gelübde) is a 1921 German silent comedy film directed by Rudolf Biebrach and starring Theodor Loos, Lotte Neumann and Eugen Rex. It premiered in Berlin on 7 June 1921. The film's art direction was by Hans Sohnle. It was based on a play by Heinrich Lautensack.

Cast
 Theodor Loos as Graf Horst 
 Lotte Neumann 
 Eugen Rex  
 Rudolf Biebrach
 Julie Abich   
 Albert Kunze  
 Albert Patry  
 Erich Walter  
 Hanns Waschatko

References

Bibliography
 Grange, William. Cultural Chronicle of the Weimar Republic.Scarecrow Press, 2008.

External links

1921 films
Films of the Weimar Republic
German silent feature films
German comedy films
Films directed by Rudolf Biebrach
German films based on plays
1921 comedy films
German black-and-white films
UFA GmbH films
Silent comedy films
1920s German films